Jeff Harada (born November 24, 1970) is an American basketball coach who is currently the head coach of the women's basketball team at California State University, Fullerton.

Coaching career 
Harada began his coaching career at Colorado as a volunteer assistant with the men's basketball team. He was promoted to director of basketball operations in 1999.

Hawaii Pacific 
Harada joined the men's basketball staff at Hawaii Pacific in 2004 as an assistant coach, and was named the women's basketball head coach in 2007. As head coach, Harada turned around a program that had only won two games the season prior to his hiring into a team that made it to the NCAA Division II Tournament in his third season (2009–10). Harada was also named the PacWest coach of the year in that same season. During his tenure at HPU (2007–11), Harada coached one all-region and eight all-conference (Pacific West) players in four years, including two freshman of the year and one newcomer of the year. While at Hawaii Pacific, he also served as their sports information director and later associate athletics director of compliance.

Navy 
Harada was hired to be an assistant coach at Navy in 2011. In his three seasons there, the team advanced to two NCAA Tournaments and one NIT Tournament, winning the Patriot League Championship twice.

Central Washington 
Harada was named the head coach at Central Washington University in 2014. At Central Washington, the Wildcats won 44 games in three seasons under Harada after only winning 25 in the previous three seasons. In his first year at Central, Harada nearly doubled the Wildcats' overall win total and nearly tripled their conference win total from the previous season.  In his second year, the Wildcats saw the highest overall win total since 2006 (17) and highest conference win total since 2004 (10). Harada coached two GNAC Freshmen of the Year (2015, 2016) and seven all-GNAC selections in his three years at CWU.

Cal State Fullerton 
Harada was named the head coach at Cal State Fullerton in 2017. In his first season he finished with more overall and Big West Conference wins than the previous two seasons combined. In year two, he nearly doubled the win total from the previous year and their 14 wins were the most since the 2009-10 season.  After leading the program to their first winning season in nearly 30 years in year three, he signed an extension that put him under contract until the 2025 season.

Head coaching record

References

External links 
 
 Cal State Fullerton Titans bio
 Central Washington profile

1970 births
Living people
Sportspeople from Honolulu
Basketball coaches from Hawaii
Colorado Buffaloes men's basketball coaches
Hawaii Pacific Sharks men's basketball coaches
Hawaii Pacific Sharks women's basketball coaches
Navy Midshipmen women's basketball coaches
Central Washington Wildcats women's basketball coaches
Cal State Fullerton Titans women's basketball coaches